Aktau (Aqtaw) is a rural locality (a village) in Akmurunsky Selsoviet, Baymaksky District, Bashkortostan, Russia. The population was 266 as of 2010. There are 5 streets.

Geography 
Aktau is located 15 km west of Baymak (the district's administrative centre) by road. Akmurun is the nearest rural locality.

References 

Rural localities in Baymaksky District